Matthews Township may refer to:

 Matthews Township, Faulkner County, Arkansas in Faulkner County, Arkansas
 Matthews Township, Chatham County, North Carolina in Chatham County, North Carolina

Township name disambiguation pages